Ameni Boukari is a Tunisian football former player and current manager. She played as a midfielder and has been a member of the Tunisia women's national team.

Club career
Boukari has played for ISSEPCK in Tunisia.

International career
Boukari was capped for Tunisia at the senior level during the 2008 African Women's Championship qualification.

See also
List of Tunisia women's international footballers

References

External links

Year of birth missing (living people)
Living people
Tunisian women's footballers
Women's association football midfielders
Tunisia women's international footballers
Tunisian football managers
Female association football managers
Women's association football managers